Mikhail Talgatovich Devyatyarov (born 25 February 1959 in Chusovoy) is a former Soviet/Russian cross-country skier who competed from 1982 to 1992, training at Armed Forces sports society in Perm. He took the gold medal in the 15 km classical and the silver medal in the 4 × 10 km relay at the 1988 Winter Olympics in Calgary.

Devyatyarov also won two medals at the 1987 FIS Nordic World Ski Championships with a silver in the 4 × 10 km relay and a bronze in the 15 km. He has taken two World cup victories.

Devyatyarov's son, Mikhail, Jr., is a retired cross-country skier who won his only World Cup race in the sprint event in Stockholm on 21 March 2007.

Cross-country skiing results
All results are sourced from the International Ski Federation (FIS).

Olympic Games
 2 medals – (1 gold, 1 silver)

World Championships
2 medals – (1 silver, 1 bronze)

World Cup

Individual podiums
2 victories
4 podiums

Team podiums
 2 podiums

References

External links

1959 births
Living people
People from Chusovoy
Soviet male cross-country skiers
Russian male cross-country skiers
Cross-country skiers at the 1988 Winter Olympics
Olympic cross-country skiers of the Soviet Union
Olympic gold medalists for the Soviet Union
Olympic silver medalists for the Soviet Union
Olympic medalists in cross-country skiing
FIS Nordic World Ski Championships medalists in cross-country skiing
Medalists at the 1988 Winter Olympics
Universiade medalists in cross-country skiing
Universiade gold medalists for the Soviet Union
Universiade bronze medalists for the Soviet Union
Competitors at the 1981 Winter Universiade
Competitors at the 1983 Winter Universiade
Sportspeople from Perm Krai